The Metapterini are a tribe of thread-legged bugs, assassin bugs of subfamily Emesinae.

Selected genera
Genera of Metapterini include:

 Anandromesa
 Barce
 Bargylia Stål, 1866
 Berlandiana
 Bobba Bergroth, 1914
 Emesaya
 Emesella
 Ghilianella
 Ghinallelia
 Hornylia
 Ischnobaena
 Ischnobaenella
 Ischnonyctes
 Jamesa
 Jamesella
 Leaylia
 Leptinoschidium
 Liaghinella
 Metapterus
 Nandariva
 Onychomesa
 Pelmatomesa
 Pseudobargylia
 Pseudometapterus
 Schidium
 Taitaia
 Tubuataita

References

External links
 http://www.discoverlife.org/nh/tx/Insecta/Hemiptera/Reduviidae/OTHER/species_list.Weirauch,_Christiane.20060306.org

Reduviidae
Hemiptera tribes